Cymothoe cottrelli is a butterfly in the family Nymphalidae. It is found in Tanzania, Malawi and Zambia. The habitat consists of forests.

The larvae feed on Rawsonia lucida and Dovyalis species.

Subspecies
Cymothoe cottrelli cottrelli (south-western Tanzania, Malawi, Zambia: western Nyika Plateau)
Cymothoe cottrelli njombe Rydon, 1996 (Tanzania)
Cymothoe cottrelli livingstonensis Darge, 2006 (Tanzania: Livingstone Mountains)

References

Butterflies described in 1980
Cymothoe (butterfly)